Hong Kong Rhapsody (花月良宵) is a 1968 Hong Kong Shaw Brothers musical film directed by Umetsugu Inoue.

Cast
Peter Chen Ho as Chen Tzu-Hsin
Lee Ching as Chang Hsiao-Ping
Allison Chang Yen as Lin Yu-Lan
Chan Hung-lit
Chin Ping
Lily Ho
Margaret Hsing Hui
Jing Ting (singing voice)
Helen Ma
Ma Xiaonong as Liu Ma
Peng Peng	
Wei Ping-Ao as Wei Chung-Liang
Yang Chih-Ching as Lin Chin-Fu
Angela Yu Chien as Li Tan-Ni

See also
Hong Kong Nocturne (1967)

References

External links

Hong Kong Cinemagic entry

Hong Kong musical films
1960s Mandarin-language films
Shaw Brothers Studio films
1968 musical films